Ahmad Mohammadpour (born February 1, 1980) is an Iranian footballer who played for Zob Ahan in the IPL.

Club career
Mohammadpour joined Zob Ahan F.C. in 2007 after spending the previous two seasons at rivals Sepahan F.C.

Club career statistics

 Assist Goals

References

1980 births
Living people
Sepahan S.C. footballers
Zob Ahan Esfahan F.C. players
Iranian footballers
Association football fullbacks